ATP-dependent RNA helicase DDX1 is an enzyme that in humans is encoded by the DDX1 gene.

Function 

DEAD box proteins, characterized by the conserved motif Asp-Glu-Ala-Asp (DEAD), are putative RNA helicases. They are implicated in a number of cellular processes involving alteration of RNA secondary structure such as translation initiation, nuclear and mitochondrial splicing, and ribosome and spliceosome assembly. Based on their distribution patterns, some members of this family are believed to be involved in embryogenesis, spermatogenesis, and cellular growth and division. This gene encodes a DEAD box protein of unknown function. It shows high transcription levels in 2 retinoblastoma cell lines and in tissues of neuroectodermal origin.

Interactions 

DDX1 has been shown to interact with HNRPK.
DDX1 has also been tentatively shown to interact with hCLE/C14orf166/RTRAF and HSPC117 in a cap-binding complex that activates mRNA translation.

References

Further reading